Jordan Hendrikse is a South African rugby union player for the  in the Pro14 Rainbow Cup SA. His regular position is fly-half.

Hendrikse was named in the  squad for the Pro14 Rainbow Cup SA competition. He was named in the Lions squad for the inaugural United Rugby Championship competition, with the first match on 24 September 2021 against Zebre.

References

South African rugby union players
Living people
Rugby union fly-halves
Lions (United Rugby Championship) players
2001 births
Golden Lions players